The Lapeer Industrial Railroad   is a short switching operation in Lapeer, Michigan, USA, which owns and operates  of track which were formerly part of a line of the Michigan Central Railroad.  It also leases  of track from Canadian National Railway (CN). It interchanges with CN near the Lapeer Amtrak station. It is a subsidiary of the Adrian and Blissfield Rail Road Company. Its customers include Lapeer Grain, Lapeer Industries and American Bath and Shower (a subsidiary of Masco Corp).

References

Michigan railroads
Railway companies established in 1999
Transportation in Lapeer County, Michigan
1999 establishments in Michigan